David Rhodes (1946 – 2022) was an American novelist. He has published six novels; the most recent, Painting Beyond Walls, was published in 2022.

Biography
Rhodes grew up outside Des Moines, Iowa.
He earned a Bachelor of Arts degree from Marlboro College in 1969 and a Master of Fine Arts degree from The Iowa Writers' Workshop in 1971.  He published The Last Fair Deal Going Down (Atlantic Little Brown, 1972), The Easter House (Harper & Row, 1974), Rock Island Line (Harper & Row, 1975), Driftless (Milkweed Editions, 2008),  Jewelweed (Milkweed Editions, 2013), and Painting Beyond Walls (Milkweed Editions, 2022).

In 1977, Rhodes suffered a motorcycle accident that left him paralyzed from the chest down.  Driftless was his first book since his return to publishing.

Rhodes lived with his wife, Edna, in rural Wonewoc, Wisconsin. He died on November 10, 2022, in Iowa City, Iowa.

Works 

The Last Fair Deal Going Down (Atlantic Little Brown, 1972)
The Easter House (Harper & Row, 1974)
Rock Island Line (Harper & Row, 1975)
Driftless (Milkweed Editions, 2008); a novel set in the Driftless Area, in the fictional town of Words, Wisconsin
Jewelweed (Milkweed Editions, 2013)
Painting Beyond Walls (Milkweed Editions, 2022)

References

External links
Poets & Writers article
Radio interview on NPR's On Point with Tom Ashbrook
 Sharma-Jensen, Geeta. "Wisconsin writer David Rhodes publishes 'Driftless'", Journal Sentinel (Milwaukee, Wisconsin), 20 October 2008.
"Driftless by David Rhodes", California Literary Review, John Holt, November 11, 2008
Maggie Ginsberg. Eerie, barely futuristic vision of a gated community in the Driftless haunts new novel from acclaimed author, Madison Magazine (Madison, Wisconsin), 20 September 2022.

1946 births
Living people
People from Wonewoc, Wisconsin
Writers from Wisconsin
Marlboro College alumni
American male writers